Devi Mukut is a mountain of the Garhwal Himalaya in Uttarakhand, India. It stands near the western rim of the Nanda Devi Sanctuary between Devistan and Devtoli. It is 59th highest located entirely within the Uttrakhand. Nanda Devi, is the highest mountain in this category. It lies 3.3 km south of Devistan I  its nearest higher neighbor. Devtoli  stands at 3.3 km SSW. It stands 4.3 km north of Maiktoli  and Nanda Devi lies 11.9 km NE.

Climbing history
A six members Japanese expedition team led by Kenji Hirasawa. They climbed Devi Mukut on September 22, 1979 which lies between Devistan I and Devtoli. This was the first ascent of the peak. Three of their members reached the summit they approached the peak by the Trisul Nala.

In September 1978 A polish team attempted the peak and reached a height of 6350 metre.

Neighboring and subsidiary peaks
Neighboring or subsidiary peaks of Deo Damla:
 Nanda Devi: 
 Trisul: 
 Devistan II: 
 Devtoli: 
 Rishi Kot: 
 Changabang:

Glaciers and rivers
Dakshini Rishi Glacier on the eastern side and Trisul Glacier on the western side. both these glacier drains into Rishi Ganga. Rishi Ganga met with Dhauli ganga near Rini. Later Dhauli ganga met with Alaknanda river at Vishnu Prayag. Alaknanda River is one of the main tributaries of river Ganga that laer joins Bhagirathi River the other main tributaries of river Ganga at Dev Prayag and became Ganga there after.

See also

 List of Himalayan peaks of Uttarakhand

References

Mountains of Uttarakhand
Six-thousanders of the Himalayas
Geography of Chamoli district